The 1922 Nottingham East by-election was held on 29 June 1922.  The by-election was held due to the death of the incumbent Coalition Conservative MP, John David Rees.  It was won by the Coalition Conservative candidate John Houfton.

Candidates
The local Liberal Association, who had not contested the previous general election, at first selected local journalist Cecil Roberts to contest the seat. However, he gave way for journalist Thomas George Graham. At the previous general election in 1918 Graham had contested Blaydon against a Liberal MP who had the support of the Coalition Government. Graham came third, polling only 5% of the vote.

Result

Aftermath
Graham did not contest Nottingham East at the general election 5 months later. He instead returned to the north east to contest Wallsend. He was no more fortunate, finishing third out of four, polling 10%. The Liberals were to win Nottingham East at the 1923 general election.

References

1922 elections in the United Kingdom
1922 in England
20th century in Nottingham
Elections in Nottingham
By-elections to the Parliament of the United Kingdom in Nottinghamshire constituencies